The 2021 Norwegian Sámi parliamentary election was held on 13 September 2021. All 39 seats in the Norwegian Sámi legislature, the Sámediggi, were up for election.

Background

Previous election
In the previous election, held on 11 September 2017, the Norwegian Sámi Association, with former President of the Sámi Parliament Aili Keskitalo as their Presidential candidate, won a plurality, with 18 of the 39 seats, including 2 on a joint list with the Sami People's Party. On 9 October, the Norwegian Sámi Association formed a coalition on the Governing Council with the Centre Party, Ávjovári Moving Sámi List and Åarjel-Saemiej Gielh, together controlling 22 seats in the Sámi Parliament. Keskitalo took office as President on 12 October after being elected by the Parliament. The Labour Party, which had governed from 2016, returned to the opposition. Other opposition parties included Nordkalottfolket, Progress Party, Guovdageainnu Residents List, Conservative Party, Sami People's Party, and Árja.

Presidential candidates
In June 2020, Aili Keskitalo announced that she would not be running for re-election as President. The Norwegian Sámi Association nominated Silje Karine Muotka, the incumbent Councillor of Environment, Industry, and Developmental Issues on the Governing Council, as their candidate. The Labour Party nominated Ronny Wilhelmsen, their Presidential candidate in 2017. The Nordkalottfolket nominated their leader, Toril Bakken Kåven.

Electoral system
The election used party-list proportional representation in 7 multi-member constituencies. Each constituency is given a minimum of 2 seats. The apportionment of the remaining 25 seats is based on the number of voters on the Sámi electoral roll on 30 June on the year of the last local elections in 2019, and allocated using the Sainte-Laguë method. Unlike elections to Storting, there are no levelling seats.

Voters aged 18 or over, and registered on the Sámi electoral roll prior to 30 June 2021, were entitled to vote in the Sámi Parliament election. To register, a voter must declare that they identify as Sámi, and that they either have Sámi as their mother tongue, have a Sámi parent, grandparent or great-grandparent, or are the child of a person already on the electoral roll. Sámi people from Sweden, Finland or Russia must be registered in Norway for the past three years in order to register.

Advance voting was available from 10 August to 10 September (1 July for voters abroad or in Svalbard or Jan Mayen), and required for voters in municipalities with fewer than 30 people on the Sámi electoral roll. In total, 8,340 votes, 40.6% of the total, were advance votes.

Results

By constituency

Vote share

Number of seats

Aftermath
The Norwegian Sámi Association presidential candidate Silje Karine Muotka declared victory on the night of the election. Muotka stated that renewal of the Muohtačalbmi coalition with the Centre Party and Ávjovári Moving Sámi List was her preference for government formation.

On 12 October, the Norwegian Sámi Association, Centre Party and Ávjovári Moving Sámi List announced that they had reached an agreement to continue cooperating within the Sámi Parliament. On 18 October, the cooperation agreement, named the Beaiveálgu Declaration after the first Sámi-language novel, was presented. Silje Karine Muotka named her Governing Council, consisting of the Norwegian Sámi Association, with one Centre Party member. Muotka was elected President of the Sámi Parliament on 21 October.

See also
2021 Norwegian parliamentary election

References

Sami, 2021
Sami, 2021
Sámi in Norway
2021 elections in Europe
Sami parliamentary election
September 2021 events in Norway
Norwegian Sámi parliamentary elections